Piliyandala is a suburb in Colombo, Sri Lanka.

Piliyandala clock tower 

According to local residents and documentation, Piliyandala clock tower is one of the tallest in the island rising to a height of 78 feet with a 16-foot girth.  The clock tower was erected by D. Simon Samarakoon, in the memory of his parents Cornelis Wijewickrema Samarakoon and his wife. The foundation stone for the erection of the clock tower was laid by the then Minister of Local Government C.W.W. Kannangara on 11 September 1952. The construction being completed in seven months, the clock tower was commissioned on 30 April 1953 and has been running ever since.

The clock tower which is in existence for more than 70 years, is considered to be of archaeological value thus providing the Piliyandala town with a historical background.

Education 
Piliyandala Central College, the first national sports school established in Sri Lanka is situated in this suburb. It is one of the first central colleges founded by Hon. C. W. W. Kannangara and has about 5,000 students. The school provides facilities for sports such as Rugby, Carrom, Cricket, Football, Girls' Football, Chess, Wushu, Badminton, Karate, Swimming, Athletics, Basketball, Volleyball and Netball. Other popular schools in the area include;

Health 
Divisional Hospital - Piliyandala (which was established as a Maternity Home in 1939) is a type - B divisional hospital belongs to Ministry of Health and Indigenous Medicine, Sri Lanka. Currently the hospital offers dental clinic, family health clinic, medical clinic, mental health clinic, ante natal clinic, baby clinic, well women clinic, family planning clinics, skin clinic, Direct Observation Treatment (DOT) for TB unit and laboratory services.

Religion
 St. Luke's Church, Piliyandala

References

Suburbs of Colombo
Populated places in Western Province, Sri Lanka